The Dalgety Bay Curling Club is a social curling club based in Dalgety Bay, Fife, Scotland.  The club plays its games at the Kinross Curling Rink in Kinross and the Edinburgh Curling Club, part of the Murrayfield Ice Rink next to Murrayfield Stadium.

The Club plays within the West of Fife province of Area 7, as allocated by the Royal Caledonian Curling Club. However, membership is open to men and women from anywhere in Scotland.

History

The Dalgety Bay Curling Club was formed in 1980.

Competitions
Internally, the Club members compete for the Stoddart and Suttie Cups, in the autumn and winter respectively, as well as thirds, knock-out, pairs, and points competitions. Within the curling area and province, the Club fields teams for the Green Hotel League, the West of Fife Province League, and a number of local bonspiels and friendlies.

See also
List of curling clubs in Scotland

References

External links
 Dalgety Bay Curling Club

Curling clubs in Scotland
Curling clubs established in 1980
1980 establishments in Scotland
Sport in Fife
Dalgety Bay